Piletocera concisalis is a moth in the family Crambidae. It was described by Francis Walker in 1859. It is found in Sri Lanka.

References

concisalis
Moths described in 1859
Moths of Sri Lanka